Richard Plant Bower (March 1, 1905 – 1996) was a Canadian diplomat. He was appointed Ambassador Extraordinary and Plenipotentiary to Venezuela then to Argentina and concurrently to Paraguay and Uruguay. He was later appointed to Japan then in 1964 he was concurrently accredited as ambassador to South Korea, Canada's first ambassador to that country. Later he became ambassador to West Germany.

Bower was born on March 1, 1905, in Kansas City, Missouri, to Thomas Toefield Bower and Mabel Hamm.  He graduated from the University of Manitoba in 1924.  He joined the Canadian diplomatic corps in 1926 and was posted to the Netherlands as a trade commissioner.  Subsequent postings included the then Dutch East Indies, New Zealand, Australia, Newfoundland (at that time an independent dominion within the British Commonwealth) and the United Kingdom.  In 1956, on his appointment as ambassador to Venezuela, Bower transferred from the Department of Industry, Trade and Commerce to the Department of External Affairs. He died in 1996.

References

External links
 Foreign Affairs and International Trade Canada Complete List of Posts

1905 births
1996 deaths
Ambassadors of Canada to West Germany
Ambassadors of Canada to South Korea
Ambassadors of Canada to Japan
Ambassadors of Canada to Uruguay
Ambassadors of Canada to Paraguay
Ambassadors of Canada to Argentina
Ambassadors of Canada to Venezuela